Saint-Fabien-de-Panet is a parish municipality in Quebec.

Demographics 

See also
 List of parish municipalities in Quebec

References

Parish municipalities in Quebec
Incorporated places in Chaudière-Appalaches